Veritas is the sixth studio album released by Gary Hughes, which was released in 2007.

Track listing 
All songs written by Gary Hughes.

 "Veritas" – 4:45
 "See Love Through My Eyes" – 4:32
 "In My Head" – 4:20
 "Time to Pray" – 4:56
 "Wide Awake in Dreamland" – 5:41
 "I Pray for You" – 4:38
 "Synchronicity" – 8:07
 "Strange" – 5:18
 "All I Want Is You" – 7:04
 "I Know It's Time" – 4:07
 "The Emerald Sea" – 3:46
 "The Everlasting Light" – 5:23

Personnel 
Gary Hughes – lead and backing vocals, guitars, bass, keyboards and programming
Chris Francis – guitars
Johnny Gibbons – guitars
John Halliwell – guitars
Rick Stewart – bass
Simon Brayshaw – bass
Jason Robinson – drums
David Ingledew – drums

Additional Backing Vocals by:
Scott Hughes – backing vocals
Hayley Hughes – backing vocals
Matthey Foy – backing vocals
Jason Thanos – backing vocals

Production 
Produced, engineered and mixed by: Gary Hughes

References

External links 
Heavy Harmonies page

Gary Hughes albums
2007 albums
Albums produced by Gary Hughes
Frontiers Records albums